Rukan Razuki Abd al-Ghafar Sulayman al-Majid al-Tikriti (1956-2003) was the head of the tribal affairs office in Iraq under Saddam Hussein and a member of Saddam's inner circle.

He was #21 on the U.S. list of most-wanted Iraqis (previously #39), and was represented by the "nine of spades" in the deck of playing cards that were printed to accompany the list.

Al-Ghafar was killed in an airstrike in 2003.

References

1956 births
2003 deaths
Arab Socialist Ba'ath Party – Iraq Region politicians
Deaths by American airstrikes
People from Tikrit
Most-wanted Iraqi playing cards